Greatest Hits is the first compilation album by American country music singer Gary Allan. It was released on March 6, 2007 on the MCA Nashville label and has been certified gold by the RIAA. The album includes the greatest hits from his first six studio albums, along with two new songs, "A Feelin' Like That" and "As the Crow Flies". The former was released as a single, reaching number 12 on the Hot Country Songs charts in 2007.

The album debuted at number five on the U.S. Billboard 200, selling about 70,000 copies in its first week.

Track listing

Personnel on new tracks
 Gary Allan - lead vocals
 Perry Coleman - background vocals (track 1)
 Chad Cromwell - drums
 Eric Darken - percussion
 Dan Dugmore - steel guitar (track 1)
 Jerry Flowers - background vocals (track 14)
 Kenny Greenberg - electric guitar
 Wes Hightower - background vocals (track 1)
 Steve Nathan - Hammond B-3 organ (track 1), piano (track 14)
 Russ Pahl - resonator guitar (track 14)
 Michael Rhodes - bass guitar
 Brent Rowan - electric guitar
 John Willis - acoustic guitar

Charts

Weekly charts

Year-end charts

Certifications

References

2007 greatest hits albums
Gary Allan albums
MCA Records compilation albums